Boos is a municipality in the county of Mayen-Koblenz in Rhineland-Palatinate, western Germany.

Geography 
The parish lies in the East Eifel, a mountain region characterised by volcanic maars and covers an area of 10.38 km², of which 5.02 km² are forest. In 2000, a nature reserve was established, the Booser Maar, with an area of 1.52 km².

Boos is the westernmost municipality of the county of Mayen-Koblenz and lies in the Volcanic Eifel, around five kilometres southeast of the Nürburgring racetrack. Northwest of the village is the Eifel Tower, erected in 2003, on the 557-metre-high hill of Schneeberg with views over the local area including the Booser Doppelmaar, a double maar.

References

Municipalities in Rhineland-Palatinate
Mayen-Koblenz